Acantholyda is a genus of sawflies.

Subgenera
The genus is divided into two subgenera:
Acantholyda Costa, 1894
Itycorsia Konow, 1897

Species

 A. aequorea Middlekauff, 1958 – North America (Calif)
 A. aglaia Zhelochovtsev, 1968
 A. aglaia aglaia Zhelochovtsev, 1968
 A. aglaia stigma Shinohara, 2001
 A. aglaia yezoensis Shinohara & Hara, 2000
 A. albomarginata (Cresson, 1880) – North America
 A. alpina Shinohara, 2000 – Japan
 A. angulata (MacGillivray, 1912) – North America
 A. apicalis (Westwood, 1874)  – North America
 A. atrata (Cresson, 1880) – North America
 A. atripes (Cresson, 1880) – North America
 A. aurigera Middlekauff, 1958 – North America (Calif)
 A. birmanica Shinohara, 2005 – Asia
 A. balanata (MacGillivray, 1923) – North America
 A. bicolorata (Norton, 1869) – North America
 A. brunnicans (Norton, 1864) – North America
 A. brunniceps (Cresson, 1880) – North America
 A. bucephala (Cresson, 1880) – North America
 A. burkei Middlekauff, 1958 – North America
 A. chicoutimiensis (Huard, 1879) – Canada (East)
 A. circumcincta (Klug, 1808) – North America
 A. crocinca Middlekauff, 1959 – North America
 A. depressa Middlekauff, 1958 – North America (AZ)
 A. dimorpha Maa, 1944
 A. erythrocephala (Linnaeus, 1758) – Europe
 A. flaviventris Shinohara, 1991
 A. flaviceps (Retzius, 1783)
 A. flavomarginata Maa, 1944
 A. floridana Greenbaum, 1975 – North America
 A. hieroglyphica (Christ, 1791) – Northern Eurasia
 A. intermedia Maa, 1949
 A. kojimai Shinohara, 2000 – Japan
 A. kumamotoi Shinohara, 2000 – Japan
 A. laricis (Giraud, 1861) – Northern Eurasia
 A. luteomaculata (Cresson, 1880) – North America
 A. maculiventris (Norton, 1869) – North America
 A. marginiventris (Cresson, 1880) – North America
 A. mexicana Liston, 1996
 A. mizunoi Shinohara, 2001
 A. nemoralis (Thomson, 1871) = A. posticalis
 A. nigripes (Cresson, 1880) – North America
 A. nigrita (Cresson, 1880) – North America
 A. ochrocera (Norton, 1869) – North America
 A. parki Shinohara & Byun, 1996 – Korea, Far Eastern Russia
 A. peiyingaopaoa Xiao, 1963
 A. piceacola Xiao & Zhou, 1986
 A. pini Rohwer, 1911 – North America
 A. pinivora Enslin, 1918 = A. posticalis
 A. pirica Shinohara, 2000 – Japan, Sakhalin
 A. poppigii (Brischke & Zaddach, 1865) – North America
 A. posticalis (Matsumura, 1912) – Northern Eurasia
 A. posticalis koreana Shinohara, 2000
 A. posticalis pinivora Enslin, 1918
 A. posticalis posticalis (Matsumura, 1912)
 A. pumilionis (Giraud, 1861) – Alpine Europe
 †A. ribesalbesensis Peñalver & Arillo, 2002
 A. ruficeps (Harrington, 1893) – North America
 A. runcinata Middlekauff, 1958 – North America
 A. serbica Vasic, 1962
 A. stellata Christ, 1791
 A. taiwana Shinohara, 1991
 A. terminalis (Cresson, 1880) – North America
 A. tesselata (Klug, 1808) – North America
 A. teunisseni Achterberg & Aartsen, 1986
 A. thalictra Middlekauff, 1958 – North America
 A. tsuyukii Shinohara, 2001
 A. verticalis (Cresson, 1880) – North America
 A. xanthiana Wei & Niu, 2008
 A. xiaoi Shinohara, 2000
 A. zappei (Rohwer, 1920) – North America

References

Sawfly genera
Sawflies